Poco Pine (1954–1974) was an American Quarter Horse stallion and breeding stallion. He earned 50 Grand Championships in his showing career and after his death was inducted into the American Quarter Horse Association's (or AQHA) AQHA Hall of Fame in 2010. Two of his descendants have also been inducted into the AQHA Hall of Fame. 37 of his offspring earned an AQHA Championship during their own showing careers.

Life

Poco Pine was a 1954 bay stallion, sired by Poco Bueno, and out of Pretty Rosalie, a daughter of Pretty Boy. As a foal, he was bought at E. Paul Waggoner's 1954 Waggoner Ranch sale by Paul Curtner. Curtner had originally intended to purchase a daughter of Blackburn and a filly by Poco Bueno, but instead ended up purchasing two different horses – a mare by Pretty Boy (Pretty Rosalie) and a colt by Poco Bueno (Poco Pine).  While still at the sale, Curtner was approached by two employees of Waggoner's, both informing Curtner that in their opinion, he'd bought the best mare in the sale. One of the employees, Pine Johnson, Waggoner's trainer, also felt that the colt was the best Poco Bueno colt he'd ever seen. Because of Johnson's praise for the colt, Curtner decided to register the foal as Poco Pine.

Show career 
Poco Pine was shown about five times as a weanling, winning all the halter classes he was shown in. Curtner, however, felt that he was slow to develop and therefore didn't show him as a yearling or as a two-year-old. By 1957 Curtner felt that Poco Pine was once again ready to perform, and took him to a show in Fort Worth, Texas. Although Poco Pine won his class, Curtner was sure the horse wouldn't win either Grand Champion or Reserve Grand Champion, and ended up betting B. F. Phillips and Billy Bush that Poco Pine would not win the championship or reserve.  Poco Pine won the Championship, which meant that Curtner lost money on his horse winning.

Curtner's goal with Poco Pine's halter career was to have the stallion win 50 Grand Championships, a goal the stallion accomplished on October 27, 1960, when he was six years old. Curtner then retired the horse from halter showing. While Poco Pine was showing at halter, he was also showing in cutting competitions and standing at stud to a large book of mares. In 1958, for example, he bred 80 mares at a stud fee of $800 as well as showing both halter and cutting. In August 1960, Poco Pine earned enough performance points to qualify for an AQHA Championship and was retired from performance showing. In total, Poco Pine earned 135 AQHA Halter points and 17 AQHA Performance points. Poco Pine was trained by Doyle Taylor, Curtner's employee and head horse trainer 

Curtner had two opportunities to sell Poco Pine during his showing career—the first time for $40,000, the second for $100,000 —but both times he turned the offers down.

Breeding career

Poco Pine's foals earned $14,794 in National Cutting Horse Association competition. He sired 37 AQHA Champions, 19 Superior Wester Pleasure Horses, 2 Superior Trail Horses, 15 Superior Halter Horses, 84 Performance Registers of Merit and 4 year end high point horses with the AQHA. He sired 19 foals crops, with a total of 464 foals. His son Poco Pecho was the sire of Pecho Dexter, who was inducted into the AQHA Hall of Fame. Another descendant inducted into the Hall of Fame was Zippo Pine Bar, who was out of a Poco Pine daughter.

Death and honors 
Poco Pine died in his sleep on November 1, 1974. He was inducted into the AQHA Hall of Fame in 2010.

Pedigree

Notes

Citations

References

 
 
 
 
 

American Quarter Horse sires
1954 animal births
1974 animal deaths
AQHA Hall of Fame (horses)